Dadi may refer to:

Places 
 Dadi (community development block), Jharkhand, India
 Dadi, China, part of the Fujian tulou World Heritage site
 Dadi, Iran, a village in Hormozgan Province, Iran
 Dadi, the old name of the town of Amfikleia in Central Greece

People 
Daði, an Icelandic given name
Dadi (given name), an Indian given name
Dadi (surname)

Other uses 
 Dadi Auto, a Chinese company
 Dadı, a Turkish TV series
 Dadi (instrument), a type of dizi, a Chinese flute

See also
 
 Daði (disambiguation)
 Daddy (disambiguation)
 Dhadi (disambiguation)